Patrick J. "Paddy" Nolan (March 17, 1881 – January 11, 1941) was mayor of Ottawa, Canada from 1934 to 1935.

He was born in Ottawa on St. Patrick's Day in 1881, the son of poor Irish parents. He worked as a clerk in a drug store, studied to become a pharmacist and opened his own drug store. He owned several movie theatres in the city.

Nolan was first elected to city council in 1922.

He died of influenza in 1941, aged 59.

References 

Chain of Office: Biographical Sketches of the Early Mayors of Ottawa (1847-1948), Dave Mullington

Businesspeople from Ontario
Mayors of Ottawa
Canadian people of Irish descent
Deaths from influenza
Infectious disease deaths in Ontario
1881 births
1941 deaths